Miss Madame is a 1934 German comedy film directed by Carl Boese and starring Jenny Jugo, Paul Hörbiger, and Olga Limburg.

The film's sets were designed by Erich Czerwonski.

Cast

References

Bibliography

External links 
 

1934 films
Films of Nazi Germany
German comedy films
1934 comedy films
1930s German-language films
Films directed by Carl Boese
German black-and-white films
1930s German films